Shankar Pokharel was sworn in as Chief Minister of Lumbini Province on 14 February 2018. Here is the list of ministers. This government has been at to fall till 11 August 2021 as ruling party of federal level, Nepali Congress and third largest party in assembly, CPN(Maoist centre) collision has reached majority with a common understanding. Shankar Pokharel resigned on 11 August 2021.

Chief Minister & Cabinet Ministers 
Final arrangement

Till August 

Till March 2021

Dispute with opposition 
Kul Prasad KC was proposed as the second Chief-minister of Lumbini Province after Shankar Pokhrel had resigned from the post by the support of NC, PSP-N and Rastriya Janamorcha as a part of National level opposition alliance with majority signatures. Still the proposal was unanimously disapproved by Governor of the province and showed an unlawful manner by appointing Pokharel in minority using CPN(UML) letter pad. Pokharel took oath by calling governor to his official residence than going to governor's which is was against the practice till date. On 5 July 2021, one sitting state minister from Shankar Pokharel cabinet resigned to bring back majority in opposition side led my main opposition party Nepali Congress. KC has previously worked as Minister for Internal Affairs and Law in Shankar Pokharel Cabinet while resigned on 6 Baishakh 2078 when he was already proposed as the next Chief minister.

On 15 July 2021, Pokharel and other sitting ministers left the house meeting when they had no chance of getting the budget bill passed. This was claimed a very un-democratic by opposition and they again claimed Pokharel  should give a resignation than disturbing the assembly with minority. They are demanding the incumbent Chief-minister to take vote of confidence to check if he's in majority else resign from post.

References

External links 

 Office of Chief Minister and Council of Ministers of Lumbini Province

Provincial cabinets of Nepal
History of Lumbini Province
2018 establishments in Nepal